Delano Thomas (born January 26, 1983, in Berkeley, California) is an American indoor volleyball player who played as a middle hitter for the U.S. National Team. He was named Best Server at the 2007 Pan American Games, where Team USA claimed the silver medal in the men's team tournament.

References

 
 

1983 births
Living people
American men's volleyball players
People from Berkeley, California
University of Hawaiʻi alumni
Volleyball players at the 2007 Pan American Games
Pan American Games medalists in volleyball
Pan American Games silver medalists for the United States
Medalists at the 2007 Pan American Games
Hawaii Rainbow Warriors volleyball players